Hottentotta stockwelli is a species of scorpion of the family Buthidae. It was first found in Andhra Pradesh and Maharashtra, India.

References

Further reading

Teruel, Rolando, and Jan Ove Rein. "A new Hottentotta Birula, 1908 from Afghanistan, with a note on the generic position of Mesobuthus songi Lourenço, Qi et Zhu, 2005 (Scorpiones: Buthidae)." Euscorpius 2010.94 (2016): 1-8.
Murthy, K., et al. "Suppressed Insulin Secretion, Elevated Mediators of Inflammation, Hyper-Insulinemia-Insulin Resistance: Insulin Administration Reverses Cardiovascular, Metabolic Changes, Pulmonary Edema and All Other Clinical Manifestations in Scorpion Envenoming Syndrome." Indian Journal of Mednodent and Allied Sciences 3.2 (2015): 90-107.

Buthidae
Animals described in 2007
Scorpions of Asia